Ewan Alman (born 31 July 1984), commonly known by his stage name, Da Brakes, is a British actor and rapper most known for his role as Fraser in the feature film Breathe.

Filmography

Discography

Albums
 2001: Brakes Yourself
 2006: Business As Usual
 2007: Still Unsigned...The Mixtape
 2009: Clean But Still Street

Singles
 2007: "Wannabe"

External links 
 Official Website for Da Brakes
 

1984 births
Living people
Black British male rappers
English male television actors
People from the London Borough of Ealing
Rappers from London